W13 may refer to:

 British NVC community W13, one of the woodland communities in the British National Vegetation Classification system
 Eagle's Nest Airport (Virginia) (FAA LID: W13), a public-use airport in Augusta County, Virginia, United States
 Hansa-Brandenburg W.13, a flying boat bomber developed in Germany in 1917
 Mercedes W13, a racecar competing in the 2022 Formula One World Championship
 W-13 nuclear warhead, a variant of the Mark 13 nuclear bomb
 W13, a postcode district in the W postcode area
 Warehouse 13, an American fantasy television series
 Wednesday 13 (born 1976), rock musician from Charlotte, North Carolina